Chebrolu is a village in Guntur district of the Indian state of Andhra Pradesh. It is the headquarters of Chebrolu mandal in Tenali revenue division. It was once a Buddhist site and territorial capital of Kakatiya dynasty. The Archaeological excavations revealed Buddhist artefacts of Satavahana and Ikshavaku period.

Etymology 

During the Satavahana dynasty, it was referred as Tambrapuri. Chattúrmukhapuram is the other name, which translates to the city facing the four points of the compass and was coined by Raja Vasireddy Venkatadri Naidu, a zamindar of Chintapalle.

History 

In 2019, a Sanskrit language inscription dated to the reign of the Satavahana king Vijaya (c. 3rd century) was found during the restoration of the local Bheemeswara temple. The inscription records the construction activities related to a Saptamatrika temple at Tambrape - an ancient name for Chebrolu. Several temples were built during the reign of Chalukya king Bhima (892-922 AD). It was also a place where several  inscriptions of Cholas like Velanadu Chodas were found.  Satyashraya of Eastern Chalukyas sent an army by his general Baya Nambi to seize of the areas of Chalukya Cholas. The general entered Vengi from the south, reduced the forts of Dharanikota and Yanamadala to ashes and established himself at Chebrolu. Vasireddy Venkatadri Nayudu built Chaturmukha Brahma Temple at Chebrolu and strengthened other temples. The famous Nageswara Swamy Temple and Galigopuram were built by Devabhaktuni brothers Kanttanna and Murthanna. Chebrolu has the only Jewish Synagogue in Andhra Pradesh dedicated to the Children of Yacob. An inscription by Jayapa mentions a Jain temple of Ananta Jina to which he made grants in 1213 AD.

Archaeological excavations 

A large horde of Satavahana coins were found in Chebrolu. The coins bore the ship figure with two masts. The inscription of Jayapa on two pillars in front of the Gopuram of Nageswara Temple (1231 AD) describes the relation between Hunas and Southern kings. It refers to the Madra King Pancola and the Videha King Hammira, the Huna and the King of Kasi waiting at his door.

Geography 

Demographics 

 census of India, Chebrolu had a population of 11,626 with 3,110 households. The total population constitute, 5,728 males and 5,898 females —a sex ratio of 1030 females per 1000 males. 1,231 children are in the age group of 0–6 years, of which 606 are boys and 625 are girls, —a ratio of 1031 per 1000. The average literacy rate stands at 69.91% with 7,267 literates.

Governance 

Chebrolu gram panchayat is the local self-government of the village. It is divided into wards and each ward is represented by a ward member. The village forms a part of Andhra Pradesh Capital Region and is under the jurisdiction of APCRDA.

Culture 

Chebrolu has more than 100 temples of great historical importance, including one dedicated to Lord Brahma. The Brahmeswara Temple is one of the few and earliest temples in India dedicated to Brahma.

Transport 

Local transport include, city buses operated by APSRTC from NTR bus station to the village. The State Highway 48 passes through Chebrolu, that connects Guntur, Tenali, Chirala. Rural roads connects the village with Lemallapadu, Vadlamudi, Vejendla and Vetapalem.

Education 

As per the school information report for the academic year 2018–19, the village has a total of 15 schools. These schools include one government school, 7 MPP and 7 private schools in which PRESIDENCY PUBLIC SCHOOL is biggest.

See also 
 List of villages in Guntur district

References

External links 

Villages in Guntur district
Mandal headquarters in Guntur district